Mitch Erickson (born May 14, 1985) is a former American football guard. He was signed by the Denver Broncos as an undrafted free agent in 2008. He played college football at South Dakota State.

Erickson has also been a member of the Seattle Seahawks.

College career
Erickson played for the South Dakota State Jackrabbits from 2004 to 2007. In 2006, Erickson was named the Associated Press All-America Third-team. He was named to the AFCA Division I Football Championship Subdivision Coaches' All-America Team, the Associated Press FCS All-America Team in 2007.

Professional career

Denver Broncos
The Denver Broncos signed Erickson to a free agent contract on April 29, 2008. On August 31, 2008, Erickson was signed to the Broncos practice squad. Erickson was signed to a reserve futures contract on January 5, 2010.

Seattle Seahawks
Erickson signed with the Seattle Seahawks on April 16, 2010. He was released on September 4.

Omaha Nighthawks
Erickson was signed by the Omaha Nighthawks of the United Football League on September 11, 2010. He re-signed with the team on June 29, 2011.

Edmonton Eskimos
Erickson signed with the Edmonton Eskimos on January 16, 2012, and was released on June 23, 2012.

References

External links
Just Sports Stats
South Dakota State Jackrabbits bio

1985 births
Living people
American football offensive tackles
American football offensive guards
Denver Broncos players
Edmonton Elks players
Omaha Nighthawks players
People from Hutchinson, Minnesota
Players of American football from Minnesota
Seattle Seahawks players
South Dakota State Jackrabbits football players